Cabinet of Norfolk Island was the council of ministers responsible to the Norfolk Legislative Assembly.

The Cabinet had four ministers:

 Chief Minister of Norfolk Island - also responsible for Tourism
 Minister for Cultural Heritage and Community Services - also responsible for Healthcare, Employment & Workers Compensation
 Minister for Environment
 Minister for Finance - also responsible for Norfolk Island Immigration Department, Telecom services

All other government departments reported to the Government as a whole. 

The Australian Government abolished the Norfolk Island Government in 2015.

References

External links
 Government of Norfolk Island and Administration Services

2015 disestablishments in Australia
Cabinets disestablished in 2015
Norfolk Island
Government of Norfolk Island